Andrés Pico (November 18, 1810 – February 14, 1876) was a Californio who became a successful rancher, fought in the contested Battle of San Pascual during the Mexican–American War, and negotiated promises of post-war protections for Californios in the 1847 Treaty of Cahuenga.  After California became one of the United States, Pico was elected to the state Assembly and Senate. He was appointed as the commanding brigadier general of the state militia during the U.S. Civil War.

Early life
Andrés Pico was born in San Diego in 1810 as a member of the Pico family of California, a prominent Californio family. He was one of several sons of José María Pico and María Eustaquia López. An older brother was Pío Pico, who twice served as governor of Alta California.

Ranchero
In 1845 under the law for secularization of former Church properties, his older brother Governor Pío Pico granted Andrés Pico and his associate Juan Manso a nine-year lease for the Mission San Fernando Rey de España lands, which encompassed nearly the entire San Fernando Valley. At that time a 35-year-old rancher, Andrés Pico lived in Pueblo de Los Ángeles. He ran cattle on the ranch and used the mission complex as his hacienda. He gave Rómulo Pico Adobe to his son.

In 1846, to raise funds for the Mexican–American War, the Pío Pico government sold secularized mission lands. The Mission San Fernando was sold to Eulogio de Celis, who established Rancho Ex-Mission San Fernando. Celis returned to Spain, but his descendants stayed in California. Under the terms of secularization, the sale excluded the Mission compound and its immediate surroundings, which were reserved for Don Andrés.

In the Mexican–American War
During the Mexican–American War, Andrés Pico commanded the native forces, the California Lancers, in Alta California. In 1846 Pico led an attack on forces commanded by U.S. General Stephen Watts Kearny at the fierce but inconclusive Battle of San Pasqual. He is sometimes confused with his older brother Pío Pico, who in 1847, was elected as the last Governor of Alta California.

On January 13, 1847, as the acting governor of Mexican Alta California (while his brother was in Mexico raising additional money for the fight against the United States), Andrés Pico approached the U.S. commander Lieutenant-Colonel John C. Frémont, man to man and alone. Without firing a shot, Don Andrés and Frémont agreed to the terms of the Ceasefire of Cahuenga, an informal agreement that ended the war in California, in exchange for promises of protection of California from abuses by Frémont's forces. Frémont agreed to stop burning Californio ranches and stop stealing horses and cattle; he and Andrés Pico became friends. The Ceasefire was confirmed by the Treaty of San Fernando, formalized at the mission.

Post-statehood activity
In 1853, Don Andrés acquired a half interest in Rancho Ex-Mission San Fernando from Eulogio F. de Celis; it was split along present-day Roscoe Boulevard, with his brother Pio Pico's land being the southern half of the San Fernando Valley to the Santa Monica Mountains.

After statehood, in 1851, Don Andrés was elected to the California State Assembly from Los Ángeles. Because of perceived anti-Californio sentiments in San Francisco, Don Andrés authored what was known as the Pico Bill in February 1859, to partition California into two states—north and south. The bill proposed to create the "Territory of Colorado" from the southern counties of the state. The bill passed both houses of the state legislature and was signed by the Governor John B. Weller on April 18, 1859. But the U.S. Congress never voted on the bill because of the outbreak of the Civil War. U.S. Congress approval was required before the proposed partition could be put to a vote of the people.

In 1858, Pico was commissioned as a brigadier general in the California Militia. In 1860, he was elected by the state legislature as a California State Senator from Los Ángeles.

On May 7, 1861, Pico, former assemblyman James R. Vineyard, and a partner won permission to make a deep slot-like road cut in the pass between the San Gabriel Mountains and the Santa Susana Mountains ranges, making what would become known as the Beale's Cut Stagecoach Pass or San Fernando Pass. The State of California awarded them a twenty-year contract to maintain the turnpike and collect tolls. Vineyard was elected to the California State Senate from Los Ángeles County (Pico's old seat) four months later, but would die in office. A landowner and surveyor named Edward Beale was appointed by newly-elected President Abraham Lincoln as the federal Surveyor General of California and Nevada. Beale challenged the general's loyalty to the new president and in 1863, Beale was awarded the right to collect the toll in the pass.

Andrés Pico's Rancho ex-Mission San Fernando was confiscated by a federal decree in 1864, which said that he "did not own and never did own" it. Reduced to a pauper, he retired as a Californio ranchero in Los Ángeles. Ex-Mission San Fernando fell into ruins until the mid-20th century, when the Roman Catholic Church conserved about one fourth of the old mission quadrangle.

Since Don Andrés' death, the bulk of the old mission has never been restored. The site of the main mission buildings are now occupied by a parochial high school, including the old, monumental front facing east toward the former Fort Tejon Road.  The sites of the Butterfield stagecoach stables, and the outbuildings and storage buildings of Don Andrés' ranch and hacienda, have been lost under development of the modern urban community of Mission Hills.

Pico married Catarina Moreno, granddaughter of Los Ángeles pobladore Jose Cesario Moreno, in San Diego. They had one son, Rómulo, and adopted a daughter, also named Catarina.

Legacy
 His son's home, the Andrés Pico Adobe, is the oldest residence in the San Fernando Valley. Having deteriorated when empty, it was restored by new owners in the early 1930s, who also extended it with an addition. Now operated as a house museum, it holds the archives of the San Fernando Valley Historical Society.  Identified as a significant property in the 1935 Historic American Buildings Survey, Andrés Pico Adobe is listed on the National Register of Historic Places and as a Los Ángeles Historic-Cultural Monument.
 Pico Boulevard, running from Santa Monica to downtown Los Ángeles, is named for Pío Pico, the former governor, but also honors the entire Pico family.

References 

Californios
Governors of Mexican California
People of Mexican California
California state senators
Members of the California State Assembly
1810 births
1876 deaths
People of the Conquest of California
Politicians from San Diego
People from the San Fernando Valley
Land owners from California
Mexican military personnel of the Mexican–American War
Union militia generals
19th-century American politicians
19th-century American businesspeople
Mexican people of African descent
Spanish people of African descent
African-American Catholics
Mexican-American people in California politics
Military personnel from California